Fullilove is an English surname. Notable people with the name include:

 Donald Fullilove (born 1958), American film and voice actor
 Michael Fullilove, Australian think tank executive director
Mindy Thompson Fullilove (born 1950), American social psychiatrist 
Robert Fullilove (born 1944), American public health researcher and civil rights activist